Cannibal is the fourth album by American extreme metal band Wretched. It was released on June 10, 2014, through Victory Records. The album features former guitarist John Vail, who plays a guitar solo on the song "Engulfed in Lethargy".

Track listing

Credits
Wretched
 Adam Cody – vocals
 Joel Moore – guitars, production, engineering
 Steven Funderburk – guitars
 Andrew Grevey – bass
 Marshall Wieczorek – drums, percussion, executive producer, engineering

Additional musicians
 John Vail – guitar solo on "Engulfed in Lethargy"

Production
 Jason Suecof – mixing
 Alan Douches – mastering
 Raf the Might – art, illustration
 Randy Pfeil – layout
 Daniel Clark Cunningham – photography

References

2014 albums
Wretched (metal band) albums
Victory Records albums